Flashlite or FlashLite may refer to:

 Adobe Flash Lite, a lightweight version of Adobe Flash Player
 Polyhedra FlashLite, a software product of ENEA AB
 Flashlite, a fictional magazine in The Mother-Daughter Book Club

See also
 Flashlight, a portable hand-held electric light